The Veterans' Alliance for Security and Democracy (VETPAC) is a multi-candidate political action committee in the United States.

VETPAC endorses, actively supports and helps fund candidates for national office who they feel share their principles of security and democracy.  These candidates are often (but not always) Veterans and Fighting Dems.

In March 2006, the group endorsed Mike Thompson's plan for redeployment in Iraq. Dubbed the "Change the Course" policy emphasized a massive increase in training of Iraqi forces using Allied training capability outside Iraq.

In August 2006, the VETPAC joined Max Cleland to speak out against the "swiftboating" of John Murtha.

Candidates VETPAC endorses
Ted Ankrum
Mishonda Baldwin
Lee Ballenger
Nancy Boyda 
Duane Burghard 
Chris Carney
John Courage
Justin Coussoule
Dan Dodd
Andrew Duck 
Bill Durston
Jay Fawcett
David Harris
Larry Kissell 
John Laesch
Patricia Madrid 
Eric Massa 
Nancy Nusbaum
Rick Penberthy
Barbara Ann Radnofsky
Gene Scharer 
Rich Sexton
Carl Sheeler
Al Weed

See also
Fighting Dems

External links
 Official site (archived)

Political advocacy groups in the United States
American military personnel
2006 elections in the United States
American veterans' organizations